Mak Fu Shing (born 14 November 2000) is a Hong Kong professional footballer who plays as a midfielder and is currently a free agent.

Club career
On 13 August 2018, Mak was one of three players signed by R&F from Hong Kong club Freemen.

On 1 August 2019, Rangers acquired Mak on a season-long loan. However, on 19 September 2019, he was recalled by R&F as the club had insufficient U-22 players for Sapling Cup.

On 13 March 2020, Mak was used as a substitute in a 4–0 victory against Happy Valley in the FA Cup.

Mak was released by the club at the end of the 2019–20 season. However, on 12 September 2020, Mak was re-signed to a short term contract until the end of the 2019–20 season.

On 3 November 2020, Mak signed for Hong Kong First Division club Sham Shui Po.

On 6 January 2023, Mak left Sham Shui Po after 2 years.

Career statistics

Club

Notes

References

Living people
2000 births
Hong Kong footballers
Association football midfielders
Hong Kong Premier League players
Hong Kong First Division League players
R&F (Hong Kong) players
Sham Shui Po SA players